The Reformed Congregational Churches (Marshall Islands) is a breakaway of the United Church of Christ-Congregational in the Marshall Islands. This split represented a desire to return to the original Congregational roots of the denomination. The total membership is 4,000 in 9 parishes and 18 house fellowships.

The church is a member of the World Communion of Reformed Churches and its partner is the Congregational Federation of Australia.

References

Churches in the Marshall Islands
Congregationalist denominations
Members of the World Communion of Reformed Churches
Reformed denominations in Oceania